Implied terms in English law are default rules for contracts on points where the terms which contracting parties expressly choose are silent, or mandatory rules which operate to override terms that the parties may have themselves chosen. The purpose of implied terms is often to supplement a contractual agreement in the interest of making the deal effective for the purpose of business, to achieve fairness between the parties or to relieve hardship.

Terms may be implied into contract through statutes, custom or by the courts. When implied by statute, Parliament may well make certain terms compulsory. The examples are numerous. For instance, the National Minimum Wage Act 1998, provides that in any contract for work, the worker must be paid according to a minimum wage set by Parliament (£6.19 per hour for workers aged 21 or over as of October 2012).

Another example is that under the Unfair Contract Terms Act 1977, liability can only be excluded when reasonable in contracts among businesses. When terms are implied by courts, the general rule is that they can be excluded by express provision in any agreement. The courts have developed an apparent distinction between terms implied "in fact" and those implied "in law". Terms implied "in fact" are said to arise when they are "strictly necessary" to give effect to the "reasonable expectations of the parties". Terms implied "in law" are confined to particular categories of contract, particularly employment contracts or contracts between landlords and tenants, as necessary incidents of the relationship. For instance, in every employment contract, there is an implied term of mutual trust and confidence, supporting the notion that workplace relations depend on partnership.

There is also an ongoing debate whether the rules of remoteness and frustration or common mistake are best characterised as implied terms. Remoteness places a limit on the compensatory award given for breach of contract, so if unlikely losses result or losses are not something that one would generally expect compensation for, compensation is not payable. Recent judicial support for its status as an "internal" rule and as an implied term derives from the judgment of Lord Hoffmann in The Achilleas. Frustration is a rule which brings contracts to an end in the event of some unforeseen event subsequent to the agreement which would make performance of obligations radically different from that envisaged, for instance because a car for sale is destroyed before it is delivered. Common mistake, as a doctrine, following The Great Peace, analogous to frustration, can similarly be said to imply a term that a contract will be extinguished if entered into on the false pretence that performance would be possible.

Implication by statute
The Sale of Goods Act 1979, section 12 states the following general rules:
In a contract of sale, the seller has the right to sell the goods
In an agreement to sell at a later date, the seller will have such a right at the time when the property is to pass
After the sale, the buyer will have and enjoy quiet possession of the goods
After the sale, the goods will be free from any charge or encumbrance in favour of any third party unless this has been made known to the buyer beforehand.
Sale of Goods Act 1979, ss 12-15 and s 55 "may (subject to the Unfair Contract Terms Act 1977) be negatived or varied by express agreement or by the course of dealing between the parties, or by such usage as binds both parties to the contract."
Unfair Contract Terms Act 1977 s 6 makes s 12 non-excludable and ss 13-15 non-excludable in consumer sales.
The Supply of Goods and Services Act 1982, sections 13 to 15 state the following general rules:
Where the supplier is acting in the course of a business, there is an implied term that the supplier will carry out the service with reasonable care and skill (section 13)
Where ... the time for the service to be carried out is not fixed by the contract, left to be fixed in a manner agreed by the contract or determined by the course of dealing between the parties, there is an implied term that the supplier will carry out the service within a reasonable time (section 14)
Where ... the consideration for the service is not determined by the contract, left to be determined in a manner agreed by the contract or determined by the course of dealing between the parties, there is an implied term that the party contracting with the supplier will pay a reasonable charge (section 15).

Implication by custom
Terms can be implied into contracts according to the custom of the market in which the contracting parties are operating. The general rule, according to Ungoed Thomas J in Cunliffe-Owen v Teather & Greenwood, is that the custom must be:

certain, notorious, reasonable, recognised as legally binding and consistent with the express terms

One of the older cases illustrating this is Hutton v Warren. Mr Warren, a landlord, leased his farm to Mr Hutton. The tenant complained that it was the countryside's custom that landlords would keep the land arable and give a reasonable allowance for seeds and labour in return for leaving manure to be purchased. Parke B held there was such a custom and that

in commercial transactions, extrinsic evidence of custome and usage is admissible to annex incidents to written contracts matters with respect to which they are silent.

Like all terms implied by courts, customs can be excluded by express terms or if they are inconsistent with a contract's nature. Lord Devlin in Kum v Wah Tat Bank Ltd.  summed up the policy of the law:

Universality, as a requirement of custom, raises not a question of law but a question of fact. There must be proof in the first place that the custom is generally accepted by those who habitually do business in the trade or market concerned. Moreover, the custom must be so generally known that an outsider who makes reasonable enquiries could not fail to be made aware of it. The size of the market or the extent of the trade affected is neither here nor there.

Implied terms in employment contracts
The following terms may be implied into contracts of employment:

Employees' duties
Duty to serve
Duty to exercise reasonable skill
Duty to obey reasonable and lawful orders
Duty of confidentiality
Duty of fidelity

Employers' duties
Duty to pay wages, including sick pay. A general presumption is that an employer's obligation to pay sick pay lasts for "a reasonable amount of time"; if a contract of employment provides for pay during sickness absence, but does not specify how long it should be paid for, then a court or tribunal may decide for how long it shall be payable.
Duty to provide work
Duty of health, safety and welfare
Duty to provide a safe working environment

An employer is also under an implied duty not to terminate a sick employee's contract of employment on the grounds of sickness (this relates to the loss of, or loss of access to, private health insurance benefits). See the 2018 Employment Appeal Tribunal case of Awan v ICTS UK Ltd.

Mutual duty
Mutual duty of trust and confidence
The employer's duty to deal with employees' grievances promptly and properly may be seen as derived from the employer's duty of trust and confidence.

Implication in fact

The Moorcock (1889) 14 PD 64
Shirlaw v Southern Foundries Ltd [1939] 2 KB 206, 207

Equitable Life Assurance Society v Hyman [2002] 1 AC 408
Paragon Finance plc v Nash [2001] EWCA Civ 1466
Attorney General of Belize v Belize Telecom Ltd [2009] UKPC 10

Implication in law

Liverpool City Council v Irwin [1976] UKHL 1
Shell UK Ltd v Lostock Garage Ltd [1976] WLR 1187
Scally v Southern Health and Social Services Board [1992] 1 AC 294,
Johnstone v Bloomsbury Health Authority [1991] 2 All ER 293
Mahmud and Malik v Bank of Credit and Commerce International SA [1998] AC 20
Crossley v Faithful & Gould Holdings Ltd [2004] EWCA Civ 293

Links with other doctrines

Remoteness

The Achilleas or Transfield Shipping Inc v Mercator Shipping Inc [2008] UKHL 48

Frustration

Historically, the test for frustration was deemed to be one of implied terms. Judge Blackburn in Taylor v Caldwell deemed a contract for the hire of a music hall frustrated – where it had been destroyed – on the grounds that there was an implied term it would continue to exist.

Such an idea has been rejected in later cases, with the ideas of Krell v Henry and Davis Contractors v Fareham UDC being preferred. This is that a contract should be found frustrated where the principal purpose for contracting becomes radically different from the original purpose, as explained by Lord Reid:

The question is whether the contract which they did make is, on its true construction, wide enough to apply to the new situation: if it is not, then it is at an end.

Common mistake

Great Peace Shipping Ltd v Tsavliris Salvage (International) Ltd [2003] QB 679
Bell v Lever Bros  [1932] AC 161
Associated Japanese Bank (International) Ltd v Credit du Nord [1989] 1 WLR 255	
Brennan v Bolt Burdon [2004] 3 WLR 1321

See also
English contract law
Contractual terms in English law
expressum facit cessare tacitum or expressio unius est exclusio alterius

Notes

References
E Peden (2001) 117 LQR 459
I MacNeil, 'Contract, Discretion and the With-Profits Mechanism (The appellate decisions in Equitable Life v Hyman)' [2000] 3 Company Financial and Insolvency Law Review 354

English contract law